World is the second studio album by Northern Irish synthpop / dance band D:Ream, released in 1995. It was to be the band's final studio release before their disbanding in 1997, and their re-forming in the late 2000s.

Overview
World was published by Magnet Records label, distributed by Warner Music major, and managed by FXU Management (some songs being published by EMI Publishing and Pumphouse Songs Inc.), and reached Number five in the UK Albums Chart. The album was mostly written, arranged, played and produced by lead singer Peter Cunnah, with the collaboration of some other musicians and vocalists. In particular, the album features TJ Davis on background vocals on all tracks (besides co-lead vocals on "The Power (Of All the Love in the World)"), as well as Simon Ellis and Nick Beggs from Ellis, Beggs & Howard. Ellis plays additional keyboards on "You've Saved My World" and "Heart of Gold", while Beggs plays bass guitar and chapman stick on "Hold Me Now". Three singles were taken from the album; "Shoot Me with Your Love" (UK #7), "Party Up the World" (UK #20) and "The Power (Of All the Love in the World)" (UK #40).

A third studio album (Heap of Faith) was recorded but never released, being replaced by the group's first greatest hits album, The Best of D:Ream in 1997.

Critical reception

Track listing
 "The Power (Of All the Love in the World)" featuring T.J. Davis – 4:55 (Peter Cunnah)
 "Shoot Me with Your Love" – 4:12 (Cunnah/Tim Hegarty)
 "You've Saved My World" – 5:09 (Cunnah/Al Mackenzie)
 "The Miracle" – 4:20 (Cunnah)
 "Call Me" – 5:22 (Cunnah)
 "Enough Is Enough" – 4:43 (Cunnah)
 "You Can't Tell Me You Cannot Buy Me Love" – 4:59 (Cunnah)
 "Party Up the World" – 4:43 (Cunnah/Peer)
 "Hold Me Now" – 4:53 (Cunnah/Jamie Petrie)
 "Heart of Gold" – 5:37 (Cunnah)

Credits
Peter Cunnah – lead vocals, all instruments
Derek Chai – background vocals (tracks 1, 2, 3, 8, 9); additional bass (tracks 3, 10); additional guitar (track 8)
Nicole Patterson – background vocals (tracks 1, 2, 3, 8, 9, 10)
TJ Davis – co-lead vocals (track 1); background vocals (tracks 2 to 10)
James Mack – additional LP percussion, Zildjian cymbals (tracks 2, 3, 10)
Jools Holland – piano (track 2)
Mark Roberts – additional drums (track 3)
Simon Ellis – additional keyboards (tracks 3, 10)
Nick Beggs – bass guitar, Chapman Stick (track 9)
Simon Bates – Yamaha wind synth (track 9)
D:Ream, Tom Frederikse for FXU – production
Mike Diver – photography and digital manipulation
Blue Source – sleeve

External links
www.d-ream.net: D:Ream's Official Website
Discogs: World album details with links to all performers
EveryHit.com: UK Top 40 Database
Paul Gambaccini, Tim Rice, Jonathan Rice (1995), British Hit Singles, Guinness Publishing

References

1995 albums
D Ream albums